Inkerman and Cerisoles were two French minesweepers named after major battles fought during the Crimean War and Italian war, and which vanished on their maiden voyage in a storm on Lake Superior in 24 November 1918. No trace of the two vessels has ever been found. 76 French sailors and two Canadian captains disappeared along with the minesweepers. Inkerman and Cerisoles are the last warships to disappear on the Great Lakes, and their sinkings caused the largest loss of life of any Lake Superior shipwreck.

Vessel specifications 
Inkerman and Cerisoles were s, designed to clear naval mines in the English Channel. Their steel-framed wooden hulls were divided into four water-tight compartments. It was rumored that because of the end of World War I, construction funds were cut short and wooden plugs took the place of metal rivets in the minesweepers, which could have led to their demise. A sister ship called Sebastopol was built alongside Inkerman and Cerisoles, and almost sank during its maiden voyage.

French naval documents refer to the ships as "chalutiers" not "dragueurs de mines." This is because the ships were designed to function as fishing trawlers after the war.

Maiden voyage and loss
In the middle of November 1918, the three minesweepers Inkerman, Cerisoles, and Sebastopol left the harbour of Fort William, Ontario, on the northern shore of Lake Superior, headed for the Atlantic Ocean via the Great Lakes and the St. Lawrence River. 76 French sailors made up the crews of Inkerman and Cerisoles, with the addition of two veteran Canadian captains, Capt. R. Wilson and W.J. Murphy. All three ships soon lost sight of each other through the snow and waves. The storm was so bad that a sailor aboard Sebastopol said "We had to get out the life boats and put on lifebelts ... the boat almost sank – and it was nearly 'goodbye' to anyone hearing from us again ... You can believe me, I will always remember that day. I can tell you that I had already given myself up to God." Water poured into Sebastopol, flooding part of her engine room and nearly putting out the coal fires in her boilers. The storm pounded Sebastopol for two days but the vessel managed to reach Sault Ste. Marie, at the eastern end of Lake Superior. What soon became apparent was that Inkerman and Cerisoles were nowhere to be found. As days passed, rumours spread that the warships sailed through the locks unnoticed all the way to the St. Lawrence River, but it was assumed the ships were lost. On 3 December 1918, ten days after the three ships left Fort William, a search effort was launched, but because of wartime censorship it was small and the public was left out of the search. The public knew nothing of the loss of Inkerman and Cerisoles until wartime censorship in Canada ended in 1918. No wreckage of Inkerman or Cerisoles was ever found, and their exact whereabouts and fates remain unknown.

List and fate of the French minesweepers built by Canadian Car and Foundry

References

 Diane Robnik, "New Light on 1918 Minesweepers Mystery," Thunder Bay Historical Museum Society, Papers and Records, XLII (2014), 3-15. . Robnik's study makes use of newly translated documents from the French naval archives in Paris.

External links
 Mark Bourrie, "Treasure hunters seek Lake Superior's 'Holy Grail'", Toronto Star, 18 October 2009, retrieved 31 December 2011.

Minesweepers of the French Navy
Maritime incidents in 1918
Ships lost with all hands
Shipwrecks of Lake Superior
Missing ships
1918 ships